Tarek Natour (born 18 August 1990) is an Israeli footballer.

He began his career in the youth team of Maccabi Haifa and later on moved to Maccabi Netanya, promoted to the senior team during the 2008/09

External links

1990 births
Living people
Arab citizens of Israel
Israeli footballers
Maccabi Netanya F.C. players
Hapoel Acre F.C. players
Hapoel Kfar Saba F.C. players
Maccabi Ahi Nazareth F.C. players
Maccabi Ironi Kiryat Ata F.C. players
Maccabi Sektzia Ma'alot Tarshiha F.C. players
Hapoel Nir Ramat HaSharon F.C. players
Beitar Nahariya F.C. players
Hapoel Asi Gilboa F.C. players
Israeli Premier League players
Liga Leumit players
Footballers from Haifa
Association football goalkeepers